Events in the year 1570 in Norway.

Incumbents
Monarch: Frederick II

Events
 Værne Kloster is burned down in connection with the Northern Seven Years' War.
 13 December – The Treaty of Stettin ends the Northern Seven Years' War.

Arts and literature

Births

Deaths

See also

References